Centaurothamnus is a genus of flowering plants in the family Asteraceae.

There is only one known species,  Centaurothamnus maximus, native to Yemen and Saudi Arabia.

References

Monotypic Asteraceae genera
Cynareae
Flora of the Arabian Peninsula